The 1893 Wofford Terriers football team represented Wofford College as an independent in the 1893 college football season. The team compiled an 0–1 record, losing its only game to Furman on November 30 by an 18–4 score. The game was played at Greenville, South Carolina.

Schedule

References

Wofford
Wofford Terriers football seasons
College football winless seasons
Wofford Terriers football